Etheriidae is a small family of medium-sized freshwater mussels, aquatic bivalve molluscs in the order Unionida.
It contains two monotypic genera.

Genera
Genera within the family Etheriidae include:
 Acostaea d'Orbigny, 1851
 Acostaea rivolii Deshayes, 1827
 Etheria Lamarck, 1807
 Etheria elliptica Lamarck, 1807
 Pseudomulleria
Pseudomulleria dalyi Smith, 1898

References

External links

 
Bivalve families